Nicolla skrjabini is a species of trematodes in the family Opecoelidae.

Distribution 
The distribution of Nicolla skrjabini includes rivers of the Azov-Black Sea and rivers of the Baltic Sea. Expansion of its host species Lithoglyphus naticoides to the Volga River has allowed Nicolla skrjabini to expand its range.

Hosts 
Hosts of Nicolla skrjabini include:
 Snail Lithoglyphus naticoides serves as the first intermediate host
 Gammarus balcanicus is the experimental second intermediate host
 Definitive host can be 27 species of fish.

References 

Animals described in 1928
Plagiorchiida